Robert Buchel might refer to:

Robert Büchel, Liechtenstein former alpine skier 
Robert Buchel (reality television), featured on My 600-lb Life